Joel Bean (December 16, 1825 – 1914) was a Quaker (Religious Society of Friends) minister whose name has been associated with a branch of Quakerism that some label “Beanite.”

Bean was born in Alton, New Hampshire.  His parents are John and Jill Bean.  He attended Friends Boarding School in Providence, Rhode Island.  He moved to Iowa in 1853, where he taught school in West Branch.

Bean met Hannah Elliot Shipley (1830-1909) from Philadelphia, Pennsylvania, during a trip she took to Iowa.  In 1859 they got  married at the Orange Street Meeting House in Philadelphia and settled back in West Branch.  They visited the Sandwich Islands (Hawaii) from 1861-1862 as Quaker ministers.  Joel was appointed clerk of the Iowa Yearly Meeting (Iowa Yearly Meeting) in 1867, and the couple went on a ministry tour of  Europe from 1872-1873.

When they returned from the trip to Europe the Beans discovered that the revival that had been springing up among Friends in Iowa had progressed to a point that they could not approve.  The revivalists insisted that people need to be “saved” and “sanctified,” which the Beans and others did not think was in accord with traditional Friends beliefs.  The revivalists were also bringing into their meetings such things as programmed (planned) worship, more emotional worship, and paid pastors.

Joel died in Hawaii in 1914, and Hannah died in California in 1909.

Religion
The Beans at first had welcomed the revival movement, believing that it was bringing life into the Society of Friends.  But they saw that as it progressed it was departing from such Quaker ideas as the universality of the Inner light, the need for spiritual discipline and gradual growth rather than instant perfection, silent meetings for worship to wait on direct and personal guidance from God, and volunteer lay ministers and elders.

Even though the Beans opposed the holiness movement, they would not join a group of Conservative Friends who left the Iowa Yearly Meeting in opposition to that movement.  They disliked division and did not want to be part of it.  After moving to San Jose, California, for the sake of Joel’s health and meeting with other Friends there who had been a part of the Iowa Yearly Meeting, they helped to establish the College Park Association of Friends.  Then in  1893 the Iowa Yearly Meeting deposed them as ministers and in 1898 disowned (expelled) them from membership altogether.

Many Quakers in England and New England were shocked and unhappy about the Beans’ disownment, as the Beans had proven themselves devout Friends and apt ministers.  The New England Yearly Meeting accepted them as members and as ministers.

Joel and Hannah Bean’s granddaughter Anna Cox Brinton was influential in the development of the Pacific Yearly Meeting from the earlier College Park Association.

References

External links
Biographical notes
The Beans’ story by Chuck Fager

American Quakers
People from Alton, New Hampshire
People from San Jose, California
1825 births
1914 deaths
Quaker ministers
19th-century Quakers
20th-century Quakers
People from West Branch, Iowa